Concerto 1 is a submarine telecommunications cable system in the North Sea connecting the UK, Netherlands and Belgium. Concerto 1 was built in 1999 by Alcatel for Flute ltd, part of the Interoute group.

It is a triangular system with three submarine segments - Concerto 1 North, Concerto 1 South and Concerto 1 East

Concerto 1 North has landing points at:
1. near Thorpeness, England, United Kingdom
3. near Zandvoort, Netherlands

Concerto 1 South has landing points at:
1. near Thorpeness, England, United Kingdom
2. near Zeebrugge, Flanders, Belgium

Concerto 1 East has landing points at:
3. near Zandvoort, Netherlands
2. near Zeebrugge, Flanders, Belgium

Note that there are two landing points at each location - the landing points are not at exactly the same points.

References

External links
 

Submarine communications cables in the North Sea
Belgium–Netherlands relations
Belgium–United Kingdom relations
Netherlands–United Kingdom relations
1999 establishments in Belgium
1999 establishments in the Netherlands
1999 establishments in England